Raúl Héctor Cocherari (born 1949) is a former Argentine football player and manager. Throughout his football career, he played for various teams from Guatemala, Honduras, Peru, Argentina, El Salvador, and Europe.

Raúl Héctor Cocherari has had spells as manager of clubs in El Salvador and Guatemala. His Salvadoran-born son Eduardo Cocherari played for Guatemala at youth and senior levels.

Achievements

External links
 laprensagrafica.com
 elsalvador.com
 archive.laprensa.com.sv
 Raúl Héctor Cocherari at BDFA.com.ar 
 

1949 births
Living people
Argentine footballers
Argentine expatriate footballers
Argentine football managers
Liga MX players
Racing Club de Avellaneda footballers
Arsenal de Sarandí footballers
Comunicaciones F.C. players
Once Municipal footballers
Alianza F.C. footballers
AC Arlésien players
US Boulogne players
C.D. Olimpia players
Comunicaciones F.C. managers
Municipal Limeño managers
Expatriate footballers in Peru
Expatriate footballers in Honduras
Expatriate footballers in El Salvador
Expatriate footballers in France
Expatriate footballers in Mexico
Expatriate football managers in El Salvador
Expatriate football managers in Guatemala
Argentine expatriate sportspeople in El Salvador
Argentine expatriate sportspeople in Guatemala
Argentine expatriate sportspeople in Honduras
Association football midfielders
Sportspeople from Avellaneda